Charles Everett Young (1868 – March 21, 1909) was an American football coach. He was the seventh head football coach at the University of Missouri, serving for one season, in 1897, and compiling a record of 5–6.

Born in St. Joseph, Missouri, Young was an alumnus of the University of Missouri, where he played college football from 1893 to 1895, captaining the team all three years. Young died at the age of 40, of typhoid fever, on March 21, 1909, at his home in St. Louis, Missouri. He was survived by his wife, Sally Burgess Young, and buried in Columbia, Missouri.

Head coaching record

References

External links
 

1868 births
1909 deaths
19th-century players of American football
Missouri Tigers football coaches
Missouri Tigers football players
Sportspeople from St. Joseph, Missouri
Players of American football from Missouri
Deaths from typhoid fever